Xiao-Li Meng (born 1963) is a Chinese American statistician and the Whipple V. N. Jones Professor of Statistics at Harvard University. He received the COPSS Presidents' Award in 2001. He has written numerous research papers about Markov chain Monte Carlo algorithms and other statistical methodology.

From 2004 to 2012, Meng was the Chair of Harvard's Department of Statistics, where he helped create innovative new statistics courses designed to give students a more positive impression of the subject. He edited the journals Bayesian Analysis from 2003 to 2005 and Statistica Sinica from 2005 to 2008. On August 14, 2012, Xiao-Li Meng was appointed dean of Harvard Graduate School of Arts and Sciences (GSAS).

Meng received his B.Sc. from Fudan University in 1982 and his Ph.D. in statistics from Harvard University in 1990. He was elected a fellow of the Institute of Mathematical Statistics in 1997 and of the American Statistical Association in 2004. He was elected fellow of the American Academy of Arts and Sciences (AAAS) in 2020.

References

External links
Xiao-Li Meng's home page

1963 births
Living people
Harvard University faculty
Fellows of the American Statistical Association
Fellows of the Institute of Mathematical Statistics
Fudan University alumni
Harvard University alumni
Scientists from Shanghai
Chinese emigrants to the United States
Fellows of the American Academy of Arts and Sciences